The Brothers Comatose is a five-piece bluegrass band based out of San Francisco, California.The band consists of brothers Ben and Alex Morrison, who play guitar and banjo, respectively, along with Steve Height on the bass, Philip Brezina with the violin, and Greg Fleischut on the mandolin.

History 
Born in Petaluma, California, frontman Ben Morrison along with his brother, Alex Morrison began playing guitar and singing songs at age 12, taking a liking to Rock and Roll. The brothers grew up around music, hosting music parties. “The Morrison house was a gathering place for local musicians – everyone would bring an instrument, call out tunes, call out changes, and just play for hours” says former Brothers Comatose bassist, Giovanni Benedetti  The band began with the two brothers doing arrangements of songs by bands such as Led Zeppelin, the Rolling Stones, and Creedence Clearwater Revival.

Since then, the group has released four records: Songs From The Stoop (2010), Respect the Van (2012),City Painted Gold (2016) and Ink, Dust and Luck (2018). They have played and headlined bluegrass festivals like Hardly Strictly Bluegrass, High Sierra Music Festival, Outside Lands Music and Arts Festival, and Kate Wolf Music Festival. The Brothers Comatose have also led extended tours with The Devil Makes Three, Yonder Mountain String Band and Lake Street Dive.

Musical style and influences 
The Brothers Comatose's style is often described as a high-energy, foot-stompin', "rowdy" folk-rock string band. The Acoustic Guitar Magazine describes their music as an "upbeat brand of Americana with lots of twang, a dash of wit, and a splash of surrealism." At many of their shows, the Brothers Comatose would encourage crowd participation, including clapping, sing-along, and passing around chopsticks to use as percussion instruments. The band redefines bluegrass music as a blend of contemporary rock and traditional bluegrass. Glide Magazine claims that the Brothers Comatose "bows both to tradition and contemporary designs. Theirs is a rugged, rustic sound that’s implied in each of these eleven songs, one that allows their old timey string band approach to ring with an air of authenticity."

Both the Morrison brothers' parents were musicians. They were inspired mostly by their mother, who was in a folk band, harmonizing with other singers in their living room. They have re-created that in their string band with three-part harmonies, with Ben Morrison's warm, gritty baritone usually taking the lead.

Discography

Albums

EPs

Singles

References 

American bluegrass music groups
Musical groups from San Francisco